Edward Philippe Pierre "Ward" de Ravet (1 June 1924 – 6 March 2013) was a Belgian actor. His wife was Belgian stage and television actress Fanny Winkler.

Death
Ward de Ravet, as he was universally known, died on 6 March 2013, aged 88. He had been in a nursing home in Zandhoven.

Filmography

References

External links

1924 births
2013 deaths
Flemish male film actors
Flemish male television actors
Actors from Antwerp